God in Heaven... Arizona on Earth is a 1972 Spanish western film directed by Juan Bosch and starred by Peter Lee Lawrence, Frank Braña, Maria Pia Conte and Roberto Camardiel.

Cast

References

Bibliography

External links 
 

Films shot in Rome
Films shot in Almería
Spanish Western (genre) films
Films directed by Juan Bosch
Films scored by Bruno Nicolai
1972 films
1972 Western (genre) films
Films produced by Ricardo Sanz